American singer and actress Mya began her career in the late 1990s. Her discography includes eight studio albums, one mixtape, three extended plays, twenty-eight singles, including ten as a featured artist, seventeen soundtrack appearances and thirty music videos on her former record labels Interscope, Universal Motown, Manhattan Recordings and Young Empire Music Group. Harrison has charted twelve entries on Billboards Hot 100 and attained one number-one single, three top ten hits, six top twenty hits, and eight top forty hits altogether. According to Billboard magazine and Nielsen SoundScan, Mya has sold over 3.2 million albums in the United States alone. As of October 2009, she has sold seven million albums worldwide. In December 2009, Billboard listed her at the 97th position on their Hot 100 Artists of 2000s.

Initially, signed to Interscope records, Harrison's eponymous debut album was released in April 1998 and certified platinum in the United States. A critical and commercial success, it produced the gold-certified top-ten single "It's All About Me" featuring Sisqó and two more top forty hits, "Movin' On" and "My First Night with You". Additionally in 1998, Harrison was invited to make vocal guest appearances on subsequent singles, "Ghetto Supastar (That Is What You Are)" and "Take Me There" which attained international chart success. The former became a massive worldwide number-one hit; while the latter, despite peaking higher in the US, became a modest hit worldwide, reaching the top ten in only a few countries. Her second studio album, Fear of Flying (2000), a multiplatinum success, was released two years later and attained international chart success as well, spawning her global breakthrough single "Case of the Ex" which did exceptionally well on the charts and a late blooming modest hit "Free". A collaboration with reggae artist Beenie Man followed. While "Girls Dem Sugar" garnered minor chart success domestically, it became a fairly modest hit worldwide. In 2001, Harrison collaborated with recording artists Christina Aguilera, Lil' Kim, and Pink on Missy Elliott's Grammy Award-winning number-one song "Lady Marmalade", a cover version recorded for the soundtrack of the film Moulin Rouge! (2001). The song became a worldwide number-one hit. By mid 2001, Harrison had already amassed an impressive nine Top 10 hits and sold more than six million albums worldwide. Her next single, "Where the Dream Takes You," a tender pop ballad recorded for the soundtrack of the Disney's film Atlantis: The Lost Empire garnered poor reception from critics and media.

The singer's third studio album, Moodring, was released in July 2003 and certified gold by the Recording Industry Association of America two months later. A minor success in international music markets, it produced two singles, which included the top-twenty hit "My Love Is Like...Wo". In the midst of promoting Moodring, video game developers Electronic Arts had approached and requested Harrison to write and record a theme song for the new James Bond video game, James Bond 007: Everything or Nothing. The result, "Everything or Nothing," a rave, techno-inspired song which was greeted with warm reception. Following a hiatus and a label change to Universal Motown, Harrison's often-delayed fourth studio album, Liberation (2007), received a digital release in Japan only and led to her 2008 Japan-exclusive album Sugar & Spice, released on Manhattan Records. In 2009, while participating on Dancing With the Stars, she released her first official mixtape on her own independent label, Planet 9, and Young Empire Music Group entitled Beauty & The Streets Vol.1.

In early 2011, Mya released two new singles, internationally, "Fabulous Life" was released in Japan. It was the first single lifted from her second Japan studio album titled, K.I.S.S. (Keep It Sexy & Simple). In North America, the NOH8 campaign theme song "Love Is the Answer". K.I.S.S. (Keep It Sexy & Simple) was released on April 20, 2011. Approximately, eight months later, Harrison released a North American edition of K.I.S.S. on December 20, 2011 digitally via iTunes through her own label imprint Planet 9. The album was supported with five digitally released singles: "Earthquake", "Somebody Come Get This Bitch", "Mr. Incredible", "Mess Up My Hair", and "Evolve".

In 2014, Mya released a four track Valentine's Day EP entitled With Love to commemorate the release of her debut single "It's All About Me" and sixteenth anniversary in the entertainment industry via iTunes. Two months later, Harrison released her second EP entitled Sweet XVI to commemorate the release of her self-titled debut album Mya (1998). In 2015, Harrison released a second Valentine's Day EP Love Elevation Suite to commemorate her seventeenth anniversary in the entertainment industry via iTunes. On February 14, 2016, Mya released her seventh independent studio project (twelfth overall), Smoove Jones, which received a Grammy nomination for Best R&B Album. In April 2018, Mya released her eighth studio album (thirteenth overall), T.K.O. (The Knock Out) to honor the twentieth anniversary of her debut album, Mya (1998).

Albums

Studio albums

Mixtapes

EPs

Singles

As lead artist

As featured artist

Promotional singles

Album appearances

Soundtrack appearances

Videography

Music videos

Notes

References

External links
 MyaMya.com — official site

Pop music discographies
Rhythm and blues discographies
Discographies of American artists
Discography